Snowboarding at the 2009 European Youth Olympic Winter Festival was held from 18 to 20 February 2009. It was held in Szczyrk, Poland.

Results

Medal table

Medalists

References 

2009 European Youth Olympic Winter Festival
2009 in snowboarding
2009